The Armed Forces Medical College (AFMC) is a public medical school in Dhaka Cantonment, Dhaka, Bangladesh. It is the only government medical college under the Ministry of Defence of Bangladesh. From 1999 to 2008 it was affiliated with University of Dhaka (DU). Currently it is affiliated with Bangladesh University of Professionals (BUP). A major general of Bangladesh Army's Medical Corps is the Commandant of the college.

History

Academic activities began on 20 June 1999.

Aims and objectives

The listed objectives of Armed Forces Medical College are a combination of medical instruction, military discipline, and general information regarding the nation of Bangladesh.

Dormitories

AFMC students viewed as 'medical cadets' and dormitory residency is compulsory. There are separate dormitories for male and female medical cadets located near the campus. The boys' dorm and the girls' dorm are identical in structure. After passing graduation, now-interns must move out of the dorms, however the option exists for outside living or an intern-only dormitory. The intern dorm is co-ed, however men and women are assigned separate sides of the building.

See also
Army Institute of Business Administration (Army IBA)
Military Institute of Science & Technology (MIST)
Army Medical College, Jessore
Army Medical College, Chittagong
Army Medical College, Bogra
Army Medical College, Comilla
Rangpur Army Medical College

References

Bangladesh University of Professionals
Universities and colleges in Dhaka
Military installations of Bangladesh
Medical colleges in Bangladesh
Bangladesh Armed Forces education and training establishments
Military education and training in Bangladesh
Educational Institutions affiliated with Bangladesh Army
Educational institutions established in 1999
1999 establishments in Bangladesh